River View Cemetery is a non-profit cemetery located in the southwest section of Portland, Oregon. Founded in 1882, it is the final resting place of many prominent and notable citizens of Oregon, including many governors and members of the United States Senate. Other notable burials include Henry Weinhard's family, W.A.S.P Pilot Hazel Ying Lee, football player Lyle Alzado, baseball player Carl Mays, and famous western lawman Virgil Earp.

History

River View Cemetery Association was founded as a non-profit cemetery by William S. Ladd, James Terwilliger, Henry Failing, Henry W. Corbett, Henry Pittock, Simon Benson, and others in 1882. All those who joined co-owned the cemetery. In 1902 a Roll Call statue was added to honor the 165 Oregonians who died in the Spanish–American War. The first adult burial was Dr. William Henry Watkins. In the 1940s a 135-person chapel was added, designed by Pietro Belluschi.

Facilities
Overlooking the Willamette River, the cemetery has a variety of mausoleums including the Hilltop Garden Mausoleum and Main Mausoleum. There are also private mausoleums and crypts. River View is an endowment care cemetery as defined by the state of Oregon.

Property and surplus land
Initially, this excess land was held for future expansion of the cemetery, but demographic trends away from burial (in favor of cremation) have reduced the need for future expansion. For example, in 1973 eight percent of Oregonians chose cremation, versus 68 percent in 2010.

In 2006, the River View Cemetery Association sought to develop  of their surplus land into residential properties, and filed a $24 million compensation claim under the 2004 Oregon Ballot Measure 37 and 2007 Oregon Ballot Measure 49. In 2007, the River View Cemetery Association submitted an application to change the zoning of the surplus land from open space to single-family residential for 182 housing units. On May 2, 2011, the City of Portland announced that it had agreed to purchase  of this undeveloped surplus land for $11.25 million, which will be managed by Portland Parks & Recreation with the initial goals of habitat stabilization, removal of invasive species, and trail and access planning.

Notable burials

 George Abernethy (1807–1877), governor of the Provisional Government of Oregon
 Henry R. Adair (1882-1916), killed in combat at the Battle of Carrizal while chasing Poncho Villa.
 George F. Alexander (1882–1948), federal judge
 Lyle Alzado (1949–1992), professional football player and actor
 George H. Atkinson (1819–1889), missionary and "Father of Oregon Schools"
 Frank M. Warren Sr. (1848–1912), millionaire and salmon cannery prominent businessman. Died in the sinking of RMS Titanic
 Thomas E. Autzen (1918–1997), philanthropist
 Thomas J. Autzen (1888–1958), industrialist and philanthropist
 Lola Baldwin (1860–1957), first female police officer in the United States
 Robert S. Bean (1854–1931), federal judge, Oregon Supreme Court Chief Justice
 Simon Benson (1852–1942), Portland businessman and philanthropist
 Ben Boloff (1893–1932), Russian-born Communist arrested, tried and convicted of criminal syndicalism
 Donald Cook (1901–1961), movie and stage actor
 Henry Ladd Corbett (1881–1957), Portland businessman and politician
 Henry Winslow Corbett (1827–1903), United States Senator
 John H. Couch (1811–1870), sea captain and pioneer
 Maurice E. Crumpacker (1886–1927), United States Congressman
 Joseph N. Dolph (1835–1897), United States Senator
 Abigail Scott Duniway (1834–1915), women's rights pioneer
 Virgil Earp (1843–1905), lawman and brother of Wyatt Earp
 Joseph Horace Eaton (1815–1896), artist and Civil War general
 Henry Failing (1834–1898), mayor of Portland
 Robert S. Farrell Jr. (c.1906–1947), Oregon Secretary of State
 A. C. Gibbs (1825–1886), Oregon Governor
 Alan Punch Green Jr. (1925–2001), United States Ambassador to Romania
 La Fayette Grover (1823–1911), Oregon Governor
 John Hicklin Hall (1854–1937), United States Attorney, Oregon legislator
 Rufus C. Holman (1877–1959), United States Senator
 Nan Wood Honeyman (1881–1970), United States Congresswoman
 James Jackson (1833–1916), Congressional Medal of Honor recipient
 Jacob Kamm (1823–1912), shipping magnate, founder of Oregon Steam Navigation Company
 Albertina Kerr (1890–1911), orphanage namesake
 William S. Ladd (1826–1893), mayor of Portland
 Roswell Lamson (1838–1903), Civil War navy hero
 Charles Henry Martin (1863–1946), Oregon Governor
 Carl Mays (1891–1971), Major League Baseball pitcher
 Wallace McCamant (1867–1944), United States Court of Appeals judge
 Dorothy McCullough Lee (1902–1981), first female mayor of Portland
 George A. White (1880–1941), journalist, Oregon Adjutant General, a founding father of The American Legion
 Hazel Ying Lee (1912–1944), Chinese-American pilot during World War II
 John H. Mitchell (1835–1905), United States Senator
 Frederick W. Mulkey (1874–1924), United States Senator
 Paul L. Patterson (1900–1956), Oregon Governor
 Sylvester Pennoyer (1831–1902), Oregon Governor
 James Tilton Pickett (1857–1889), newspaper writer, son of George Pickett
 Henry Pittock (1836–1919), publisher of The Oregonian newspaper
 Harvey W. Scott (1838–1910), editor of The Oregonian newspaper
 Joseph Showalter Smith (1824–1884), United States Congressman
 Isaac W. Smith (1826–1897), Portland Pioneer, first Chief Engineer, "father" of Portland's water system
 Lansing Stout (1828–1871), United States Congressman
 Owen Summers (1850–1911), soldier, Oregon legislator
 James Terwilliger (d. 1892), Portland pioneer, street namesake
 Mandana Coleman Thorp (1843-1916), American Civil War nurse, singer, patriot; public official
 Frances Fuller Victor (1826–1902), writer and historian
 Henry Weinhard (1830–1904), brewer and Portland businessman
 Narcissa Edith White Kinney (1851–1901), temperance worker
 George Henry Williams (1823–1910), United States Attorney General
 Richard Williams (1836–1914), United States Congressman
 George L. Woods (1832–1890), Oregon Governor
 Bud Clark (1931–2022), mayor of Portland

References

External links

 
 Portland Mercury: Buried in claims
 1932 picture inside River View
 Picture of cemetery

1882 establishments in Oregon
Cemeteries in Portland, Oregon
Southwest Portland, Oregon